Simplemente (English: Simply) is the tenth studio album recorded by Puerto Rican performer Chayanne. It was released by Sony Music Latin and Columbia Records on October 3, 2000 (see 2000 in music).

On February 6, 2001, this album was released with two bonus tracks.

It received a nomination for a Grammy Award for Best Latin Pop Album in the 44th Annual Grammy Awards on February 27, 2002. The album was certified gold and platinum in several countries and is considered to be one of the best-selling albums in Chile.

Track listing

†Only available in the 2001 re-release of Simplemente.

Music videos
Candela
Yo Te Amo
Vivo
Boom Boom
Ay Mamá

Charts

Year-end charts

Sales and certifications

References

2000 albums
Chayanne albums
Spanish-language albums
Sony Discos albums
Columbia Records albums
Albums produced by Estéfano
Albums produced by Desmond Child